Events in the year 1536 in Norway.

Incumbents
Monarch: Interregnum (Olav Engelbrektsson as Regent)

Events

 The Reformation in Norway starts.
3 January – Realm council Vincens Lunge is murdered in Nidaros, and other people lojal to Christian III of Denmark is arrested. This event marks the beginning of the Reformation in Norway and Olav Engelbrektssons rebellion.
7 January – Archbishop Olav Engelbrektsson sent squads of supporters to villages in Eastern Norway; the squads proclaimed to the people that a new ruler (Frederick the Wise) could be on his way. 
January–April – Many farmers and bourgeoisie in Eastern Norway rises up in rebellion for the Archbishop, but it soon failed as no actual support from Frederick came.
March – The Archbishops forces led by Kristoffer Throndsen, fails to capture Bergenhus Fortress, and Throndsen is arrested during a parley with the commanders of the fort. 
April – Olav Engelbrektsson releases supporters of Christian III from prison at Tautra.

Full date unknown
 Munkeliv Abbey was destroyed by fire and was never rebuild. 
 The town of Tønsberg was destroyed by fire.
 Halsnøy Abbey was dissolved.
 Lyse Abbey was dissolved.

Deaths
3 January – Vincens Lunge, Realm counselor.

See also

References